Burton upon Trent consists of the following civil parishes containing listed buildings.

Listed buildings in Anglesey, Staffordshire
Listed buildings in Burton (civil parish)
Listed buildings in Horninglow and Eton
Listed buildings in Outwoods, East Staffordshire
Listed buildings in Shobnall
Listed buildings in Stapenhill
Listed buildings in Stretton, East Staffordshire
Listed buildings in Winshill

Lists of protected areas lists
Burton